Current Lake is an unincorporated community in Ellsborough Township, Murray County, Minnesota, United States. The most southwestern fur trading post in Minnesota was not far from here.

Notes

Unincorporated communities in Murray County, Minnesota
Unincorporated communities in Minnesota